The Dash Stakes was an American Thoroughbred horse race first run in 1887 at Sheepshead Bay Race Track in Sheepshead Bay, Brooklyn, New York. A race for two-year-old horses of either sex, it was run on dirt over a distance of 5¾ furlongs.

An annual event, the Dash Stakes had its final running as an overnight purse on September 1, 1909 after the Republican controlled New York Legislature under Governor Charles Evans Hughes passed the Hart–Agnew anti-betting legislation on June 11, 1908 with penalties allowing for fines and up to a year in prison.
 The owners of Sheepshead Bay Race Track, and other racing facilities in New York State, struggled to stay in business without betting. Racetrack operators had no choice but to drastically reduce the purse money being paid out; by 1909 the Dash Stakes offered a purse that was as little as one twelfth of what it had been in earlier years. Further restrictive legislation was passed by the New York Legislature in 1910 which deepened the financial crisis for track operators and led to a complete shut down of racing across the state during 1911 and 1912. When a court ruling saw racing return in 1913 it was too late for the Sheepshead Bay facility and it never reopened.

Records
Speed record:
 5.75 furlongs: 1:11.80 – Miss Kearney (1908)
 5 furlongs: 0:58.60 – Jacobite (1905)

Most wins by a jockey:
 3 – Danny Maher (1897, 1898, 1900)

Most wins by a trainer: Ŧ
 2 – A. Jack Joyner (1902, 1905) 
 2 – Byron McClelland (1893, 1898)

Most wins by an owner: 
 2 – Byron McClelland (1893, 1898)
 Ŧ based on 20 of the 23 years the race was run.

Winners

References

Flat horse races for two-year-olds
Open sprint category horse races
Discontinued horse races in New York City
Sheepshead Bay Race Track
Recurring sporting events established in 1887
Recurring sporting events disestablished in 1909
1887 establishments in New York (state)
1909 disestablishments in New York (state)